Urquijo is a surname. Notable people with the surname include:

Adolfo de Urquijo e Ibarra (1866–1933), Alfonsist politician, publisher, and expert in Basque culture and history
Alfonso de Urquijo (1920–1994), Spanish professional hunter, writer and banker
Álvaro Urquijo (born 1962), Spanish guitarist and singer-songwriter
Antonio María Oriol Urquijo (1913–1996), Spanish politician and businessman
Araceli Sánchez Urquijo (1920–2010), Niños de Rusia child evacuee during the Spanish Civil War, first woman to work as a civil engineer in Spain
Enrique Urquijo (1960–1999), Spanish singer, songwriter, and guitarist
Gonzalo Urquijo (born 1989), Argentine professional footballer
Harold Urquijo (born 1988), Colombian footballer
José Antonio Urquijo (born 1960), Chilean former track cyclist
José María de Oriol y Urquijo (1905–1985), Spanish entrepreneur, Carlist and Francoist politician
Julio de Urquijo e Ibarra (1871–1950), Basque linguist, cultural activist, and a Spanish Carlist politician
Luis de Urquijo, 2nd Marquess of Bolarque (1899–1975), Spanish Ambassador to West Germany
Mariano Luis de Urquijo (1769–1817), Secretary of State (Prime Minister) of Spain
Miguel Primo de Rivera y Urquijo (1934–2018), Spanish politician, lawyer and businessman
Myriam de Urquijo (1918–2011), (born Pilar Palacios de Urquijo), Argentine film, stage and television actress
Rocio Urquijo (1935–2009), Spanish artist, first wife of Filipino industrialist Enrique Zobel

See also
Marquess of Urquijo (Spanish: Marqués de Urquijo) is a noble title in the peerage of Spain
Assassination of the Marquesses of Urquijo

Spanish-language surnames